Elizabeth Edwina Smither  (born 15 September 1941) is a New Zealand poet and writer.

Life and career
Smither was born in New Plymouth, and worked there part-time as a librarian.

Her first collection of poetry, Here Come the Clouds, was published in 1975, when she was in her mid-thirties. She has since published over fifteen poetry collections, as well as several short story collections and novels. Her work has won numerous notable awards, including three times the top poetry award at the New Zealand Book Awards. In 2002, she was named the New Zealand Poet Laureate.

Harry Ricketts, writing for The Oxford Companion to New Zealand Literature, describes her strength as being "the short poem, usually but not always unrhymed, witty, stylish and intellectually curious". He also notes that her poetry tends to feature figures from literature and legends, as well as Catholicism.

Awards
1987 Scholarship in Letters
1989 Lilian Ida Smith Award (non-fiction)
1990 New Zealand Book Award for Poetry
1992 Scholarship in Letters
2000 Montana New Zealand Book Award for Poetry
2002 Te Mata Poet Laureate
2008 Prime Minister's Award for Literary Achievement in poetry
2012 Landfall Essay Competition
2014 NZSA Janet Frame Memorial Award
2016 Sarah Broom Poetry Prize
2018 Ockhams New Zealand Book Award for Poetry

Bibliography

Poetry

Collections

 You’re Very Seductive William Carlos Williams (1978)
 The Sarah Train (1980)
 The Legend of Marcello Mastroianni's wife (1981)
 Casanova's Ankle (1981)
 Shakespeare Virgins (1983)
 Professor Musgrove's Canary (1986)
 Gorilla/ Guerilla (1986)
 Animaux (1988)
 A Pattern of Marching (1989)
 A Cortège of Daughters (1993)
 The Tudor Style: Poems New and Selected (1993)

 Horse Playing the Accordion (Ahadada Books, Tokyo & Toronto, 2009)
The Love of One Orange

Anthologies

List of poems

Novels
 First Blood (1983)
 Brother-love Sister-love (1986)
 The Sea Between Us (2003) ''2004 Finalist for the Montana New Zealand Book Awards

Short Stories
 Nights at the Embassy (1990)
 Mr Fish (1994)

References

External links
"Elizabeth Smither", New Zealand Electronic Poetry Centre
Interview at Academy of New Zealand Literature

1941 births
Living people
Meanjin people
Members of the New Zealand Order of Merit
New Zealand women poets
New Zealand Poets Laureate